Abesadze is a Georgian surname. Notable people with the surname include:
Inessa Abesadze (born 1940), Soviet and Georgian theater and film actress
Nino Abesadze (born 1965), Israeli politician and journalist

Surnames of Georgian origin
Georgian-language surnames